Robert Vincent O’Neil (September 15, 1930 – March 12, 2022) was an American screenwriter, film director, and playwright. Best known for directing and co-writing the film Angel, he co-wrote films including The Baltimore Bullet and Vice Squad, and created the television series Lady Blue. He died on March 12, 2022, at the age of 91.

References 

1930 births
2022 deaths
American dramatists and playwrights
American film directors
American screenwriters